Norris "Norey" James Graham (January 25, 1906 – July 9, 1980) was an American rower, born in Portland, Oregon, who competed in the 1932 Summer Olympics.

In 1932, he won the gold medal as coxswain of the American boat in the eights competition.

References

External links
 
 
 
 

1906 births
1980 deaths
Sportspeople from Portland, Oregon
Coxswains (rowing)
Rowers at the 1932 Summer Olympics
Olympic gold medalists for the United States in rowing
American male rowers
Medalists at the 1932 Summer Olympics